New Song may refer to:

 "A New Song", a pamphlet of poems, chants, ballads and songs published by the International Workers Order in 1938


Music

Songs 

"New Song" (Howard Jones song), a 1983 song
"New Song" (Warpaint song), a 2016 song
"New Song" (The Who song), a 1978 song
"New Song", a song by Avail from their 2000 album One Wrench
"New Song" a song by UK Pop-Punk band Son of Dork
"New Song", a song by Sublime on their debut album 40 Oz. to Freedom

Other 

NewSong, a contemporary Christian music group
 New Song, a music ministry and recording group sponsored by Geneva College
The New Song movement, Nueva canción, an Ibero-American movement and musical genre whose lyrics focus on social justice issues, originating in the 2016
The New Song, La Nova Cançó, a Catalan music movement during francoism

Churches 

New Song Church, a church in Fair Lawn, New Jersey, United States
Newsong Church, a church in Santa Ana, California, United States, which was formerly a megachurch with several global locations

See also
, for a listing of songs titled "New"